The 1985–86 Iowa State Cyclones men's basketball team represented Iowa State University during the 1985–86 NCAA Division I men's basketball season. The Cyclones were coached by Johnny Orr, who was in his 6th season. They played their home games at Hilton Coliseum in Ames, Iowa.

They finished the season 22–11, 9–5 in Big Eight play to finish in 2nd place. The Cyclones advanced to the Big Eight tournament championship game against #2 Kansas, falling 73–71. They qualified for the NCAA Tournament as a 7 seed, defeating 10-seed Miami (Ohio) and 2-seed Michigan before falling to 6-seed NC State in the Sweet Sixteen.

Roster

Schedule and results 

|-
!colspan=6 style=""|Regular Season

|-
!colspan=6 style=""|Exhibition

|-
!colspan=6 style=""|Regular Season

|-
!colspan=6 style=""|Big Eight tournament

|-
!colspan=6 style=""|NCAA Tournament

|-

Team players in the 1986 NBA Draft

References 

Iowa State Cyclones men's basketball seasons
Iowa State
Iowa State
Iowa State Cyc
Iowa State Cyc